Gagik I Artsruni (879/880 – 943) was an Armenian noble of the Artsruni dynasty who ruled over Vaspurakan in southern Armenia, first as prince of northwestern Vaspurakan (Gagik III, 904–908) and after that until his death as King of Vaspurakan, also claiming the title of King of Armenia.

Background
Since the end of the 7th century, Armenia was under Arab dominion and headed by an ostikan (governor) representing the Umayyad, and later Abbasid caliphates, and was the scene of numerous battles against the Byzantine Empire since the 9th century. To strengthen the Arab authority, these ostikans were implanted into various regions of Armenian emirs; the historical province of Vaspurakan was no exception to this. In opposition, the Armenian nobility created ishkhans (princes) to gradually extend their authority in the region.

Biography

Youth and regency
Second son of Grigor-Derenik Artsruni, the Prince of Vaspurakan, and Sophia Bagratuni, the daughter of King Ashot I of Armenia, Gagik was born in 879 or 880. Upon the death of Grigor-Derenik in 887, Gagik Apumrvan Artsruni became regent of Vaspurakan (and later ishksan) and was given Grigor-Derenik's three children Gagik, Ashot-Sargis, and Gurgen. In response to Gagik Apumrvan Artsruni's defection in a military operation ordered by Smbat I, Gagik I Artsruni killed Gagik Apumrvan Artsruni and Ashot-Sargis was given the regency. In response to this, Smbat I promoted Gagik to the rank of general and Gurgen to marzpan (governor).

Ishkhan
Gagik succeeded his elder brother Ashot-Sargis as ishkhan in 904 and allowed Gourgen to rule over the southeastern possessions of the Artsruni family; both worked well together until the death of Gurgen in 923. After various rebel attacks, Gagik developed a talent for creating military and political strategies and worked towards decreasing the number of Muslim enclaves of Vaspurakan.

King
Gagik was an ally of the Sajid emir of Azerbaijan Yusuf ibn Abi'l-Saj, from whom he received recognition as king in 908, against the Bagratid Smbat I. His state was recognized by the Byzantine Empire, who awarded him the title of "prince of princes" traditionally borne by the pre-eminent Armenian ruler, and his legitimacy received a further boost when the Armenian catholicos, John V the Historian, abandoned Muslim-ruled Dvin for Vaspurakan in 924. However, Gagik later reversed his position and allied himself with Smbat's son and successor, Ashot II. He is also notable as the founder of the Armenian Cathedral of the Holy Cross.

References

Bibliography

Further reading 
 

9th-century births
10th-century deaths
10th-century monarchs of Vaspurakan
Artsruni dynasty
Princes of Vaspurakan
10th-century Armenian people